Ludwig van Beethoven is a series of sculptures of Ludwig van Beethoven by German-American sculptor Henry Baerer. Versions are displayed in Central Park and Prospect Park in New York City, as well as Golden Gate Park in San Francisco. The sculpture in Central Park was dedicated on July 22, 1884. It includes two bronze statues, including a bust of Beethoven and an allegorical female figure on a polished Barre Granite pedestal.

See also

 1884 in art

References

External links

 Prospect Park: Beethoven Memorial, New York City Department of Parks and Recreation

1884 establishments in New York (state)
Allegorical sculptures in the United States
Bronze sculptures in Brooklyn
Bronze sculptures in California
Bronze sculptures in Manhattan
Busts in California
Busts in New York City
Golden Gate Park
Monuments and memorials in Brooklyn
Monuments and memorials in California
Monuments and memorials in Manhattan
Outdoor sculptures in Brooklyn
Outdoor sculptures in Manhattan
Outdoor sculptures in San Francisco
Prospect Park (Brooklyn)
Sculptures in Central Park
Sculptures of Ludwig van Beethoven
Sculptures of men in California
Sculptures of men in New York City
Statues in New York City
Statues in San Francisco